Middle Moriah Mountain is a mountain located in Coos County, New Hampshire. The mountain is part of the Carter-Moriah Range of the White Mountains, which runs along the northern east side of Pinkham Notch.  Middle Moriah is flanked to the northeast by Shelburne Moriah Mountain, and to the southwest by Mount Moriah.

See also

 List of mountains in New Hampshire
 White Mountain National Forest

References

External links
 "Hiking Middle Carter Mountain". Appalachian Mountain Club

Mountains of New Hampshire
Mountains of Coös County, New Hampshire